Avolette is a former French auto-maker.

History
The Société Air Tourist company, with its little factory at Paris in the rue de Ponthieu, began production of a small three-wheeled car in 1955. Production probably never progressed beyond the prototype stage and ended in 1958.

The car
There was a single model, manufactured under license from Brütsch of Stuttgart.  The car featured three wheels, with the single wheel at the back. Also at the back was a single-cylinder engine of between 125 cc und 250 cc. Engines came from various suppliers including Lambretta, Maico, Sachs and Ydral.

Notes

References
 Harald H. Linz, Halwart Schrader: Die große Automobil-Enzyklopädie, BLV, München 1986, 
 G.N. Georgano: Autos. Encyclopédie complète. 1885 à nos jours. Courtille, 1975 (French)

External links
 Internet site of the GTÜ

Defunct motor vehicle manufacturers of France
Manufacturing companies based in Paris
Cars introduced in 1955
Rear-engined vehicles